David Kudrave (born March 10, 1966 in Los Angeles), is an American former open wheel racing driver.  He raced in the 1993 CART season, with 8 career starts.  His best finish came in his first race, the Valvoline 200 at Phoenix International Raceway.  Kudrave also raced in the 1996 and 1996-1997 Indy Racing League seasons, with 3 starts.  Coincidentally, his best IRL finish was in 10th position in the 1996 Dura Lube 200, also at PIR. Currently, David is out of racing and is in the real estate brokerage business in Southern California.

Early life 
Born and raised in Los Angeles, California, Kudrave and his father would annually journey from their family home to the now defunct Ontario Motor Speedway where they would watch racing legends like Mario Andretti, A.J. Foyt, and others compete. He has described this experience by saying "Those drivers were thrill-seekers and I knew then that I wanted to get into it." This led Kudrave to begin racing at just 12 years old. He attended the Jim Russell British School of Motor Racing at 15 years old, lying about his age in order to be eligible for the program, but still beating the older attendees in most of the races that he participated in. He began competing in a racing series sponsored by Russell after finishing the program and then moved up to the Formula Ford Circuit, a class generally regarded as the most competitive amateur open-wheel class in the nation. Kudrave also attended the University of Southern California, majoring in Economics.

Early career 
In 1985, Kudrave officially became a professional open-wheel race car driver by moving up to the Super Vee Series, which features cars with 200 horsepower engines. Just one year after he entered the series, he finished the season in sixth place. In 1987 he won three races, one pole position, and led for more laps and miles than any other competitor. He finished the series in second, just 20 points behind series champion Scott Atchinson. His worst race finish that year was fourth place, and he was voted the series "Most Improved Driver". That year Kudrave was publicly praised by then Formula One driver Dan Gurney, who said "He's talented, no doubt about it."

CART

1993 season 
Kudrave made his CART debut in 1993, racing for the Euromotorsport team. His first start was in the Valvoline 200 in Phoenix Arizona. Throughout his first season he had 7 starts, with his best finish in eighth place. He finished the season with 6 points.

1994 season 
With growing tension and criticism of the CART Series, the 1994 season was plagued by rumors that the series was going to fall apart. Kudrave did not start in any races that year, but would return to racing the following year in the newly-formed Indy Racing League (now called the IndyCar Series).

IndyCar

1996 season 
Kudrave's return to racing with Tempero-Giuffre Racing started in the Indy 200 at the Walt Disney World Speedway, where he finished in twentieth. This was then followed by a tenth-place finish in Phoenix. In the third round of the season, he was set to race in the Indianapolis 500 at the Indianapolis Motor Speedway, before a complication within his team prevented him from being able to participate in the race. After the third round, Kudrave would not start another race until the following season. He finished the season with 80 points, ranked 19th overall.

1996-1997 season 
Kudrave participated in just one race in the 1996-1997 Season in the Indy 225, which took place at the New Hampshire Motor Speedway. He finished the race in 17th place, giving him 18 points for the season. At the end of the season he was ranked 47th overall. The 1996-1997 Indy Racing League Season would be his final season of his racing career.

Racing record

American Open Wheel
(key)

CART

IndyCar

References

External links
David Kudrave at CB Richard Ellis

1966 births
Living people
Champ Car drivers
IndyCar Series drivers
Indy Lights drivers
SCCA Formula Super Vee drivers
Racing drivers from Los Angeles
EuroInternational drivers